Ascarops is a genus of nematodes belonging to the family Spirocercidae.

Species:

Ascarops africana 
Ascarops dentata 
Ascarops kutassi 
Ascarops minuta 
Ascarops mogera 
Ascarops nema
Ascarops scaptochiri 
Ascarops strongylina 
Ascarops talpa

References

Nematodes